The Château de Saint-Paul-d'Oueil is a castle in the commune of Saint-Paul-d'Oueil in the Haute-Garonne département of France.

Privately owned, it has been listed since 1947 as a monument historique by the French Ministry of Culture.

See also
List of castles in France

References

External links
 

Castles in Haute-Garonne
Monuments historiques of Haute-Garonne